is a Japanese filmmaker, film producer, screenwriter, editor, director, cinematographer, art director, production designer and actor.

With a considerable cult following both domestically and abroad, Tsukamoto is best known for his body horror/cyberpunk film Tetsuo: The Iron Man (1989), which is considered the defining film of the Japanese Cyberpunk movement, as well as for its companion pieces Tetsuo II: Body Hammer (1992) and Tetsuo: The Bullet Man (2009).

His other films include Tokyo Fist (1995), Bullet Ballet (1998), A Snake of June (2002), Vital (2004), Kotoko (2011) and Killing (2018).

In addition to starring in almost all his films, Tsukamoto has also appeared as an actor in films by other directors, including Martin Scorsese, Takashi Miike and Hideaki Anno. He has been cited as an influence on popular western filmmakers such as Quentin Tarantino, David Fincher, Darren Aronofsky and The Wachowskis.

Biography
Tsukamoto began making films at age 14, when his father gave him a Super 8 camera. His cinematic influences include David Lynch, David Cronenberg, and Akira Kurosawa. He made a number of films, ranging from 10-minute shorts to 2-hour features, until his first year at college when he temporarily lost interest in filmmaking. Tsukamoto then started up a theatre group, which soon included Kei Fujiwara, Nobu Kanaoka and Tomorowo Taguchi, all of whom would continue to work with Tsukamoto up through the filming of Tetsuo: The Iron Man. One of their theatre productions at this time was The Adventures of Electric Rod Boy. At the end of production, Tsukamoto did not want to waste all the effort they had put into building the set, so he decided to shoot a film version.

Tsukamoto's early films, The Phantom of Regular Size (1986) and The Adventures Of Electric Rod Boy (1987), were short subject science fiction films shot on color 8 mm film that led to his black & white 16 mm feature Tetsuo: The Iron Man. Tsukamoto has stated he has a love-hate relationship with Tokyo, and in the end the characters (Tsukamoto and Taguchi) set out to destroy it. Tetsuo is considered one of the prime examples of Japanese cyberpunk.

Tsukamoto's next film, Hiruko the Goblin, was a more conventional horror film, about demons being unleashed from the gates of hell.  He then created a follow-up to Tetsuo, Tetsuo II: Body Hammer (1992), which revisited many of the same themes as the first but with a bigger budget and shot in color on 35 mm film. As a result, the film is often interpreted more as a companion piece than a true sequel. In Body Hammer, the son of a salaryman (Taguchi) is kidnapped by a group of thugs, who then force the man's nascent rage to make him mutate into a gigantic human weapon. Tokyo Fist (1995) again dealt with the idea of rage as a transformative force (similar to David Cronenberg's The Brood [1979]).  Here, a meek insurance salesman (Tsukamoto) discovers that an old friend of his, now a semi-professional boxer, may be having an affair with his fiancée.  The salesman then enters into a rigorous and self-destructive boxing training program to get even.

In Bullet Ballet (1998), a man (Tsukamoto) discovers that his longtime girlfriend committed suicide with a gun, and becomes obsessed with getting a gun just like that one. His single minded behavior causes him to run afoul of a gang of thugs, especially when he shows interest in the young girl who is one of their compatriots. Gemini (1999) was an adaptation of an Edogawa Rampo story, in which a country doctor with pretensions of superiority has his life torn apart when another man who appears to be his exact duplicate enters his life.  Things are complicated further by the twin taking control of his wife, an amnesiac with a criminal background. A Snake of June (2002) once again found Tsukamoto employing the formula of two men in competition for one woman, as a young lady is blackmailed into perverse sexual behavior against her husband's will—until her husband finds that he enjoys the blackmail more than the blackmailer does.

Vital (2004) again features a love triangle, this time consisting of two women and one man. The story concerns a young man whose girlfriend is killed in a car crash whilst being driven by him. He is a medical student and is given her body to dissect in class (whether by coincidence or intentionally is not clear).  Tsukamoto also acted in and directed the short film Haze in 2005. In 2006, Tsukamoto directed the horror thriller Nightmare Detective (2006). The film centers around a vagrant with the supernatural ability to enter the dreams of others and a police officer who pleads with him to help her solve a series of bizarre murders committed by a serial killer (Tsukamoto) with a similar ability.

Tsukamoto acts in nearly all of his films, with the exception of those that he worked on as a "director for hire" (namely Hiruko the Goblin and Gemini). Tsukamoto has appeared in many other directors' films as well, such as Takashi Miike's Dead or Alive 2: Birds (2000), and Ichi the Killer (2001), as well as Teruo Ishii's Blind Beast vs. Dwarf (2001).  He was the lead actor in Takashi Shimizu's Marebito (2004), and appeared more recently in Welcome to the Quiet Room (2007), Hideaki Anno's Shin Godzilla (2016) and Martin Scorsese's Silence (2016).

He is also a successful voiceover artist for TV advertising in Japan. He also provided the Japanese voice of Vamp in the 2008 PlayStation 3 game Metal Gear Solid 4: Guns of the Patriots. Tsukamoto was originally set to play the character in Metal Gear Solid 2: Sons of Liberty (after Hideo Kojima's first choice, Kaneto Shiozawa, died before casting began) but was unavailable due to scheduling conflicts, so Ryōtarō Okiayu was assigned the role instead.

Tsukamoto was a member of the jury at the Venice International Film Festival in 1997 and 2019.

Awards 
As per references:
The Adventures of Electric Rod Boy – PIA Film Fest (Japan) – Grand Prize
Tetsuo: The Iron Man – Fantafestival (Italy) – Grand Prize
Tetsuo: The Iron Man – Sweden Fantastic Film Festival – Audience Award Best Feature
Hiruko the Goblin – Fantasporto – Best Film
Tetsuo II: Body Hammer – Brussels International Festival of Fantasy Film – Silver Raven
Tetsuo II: Body Hammer – Fantasporto – International Fantasy Film Special Jury Award
Tetsuo II: Body Hammer – 3rd Yubari International Fantastic Film Festival (1992)
Tokyo Fist – Sundance (Tokyo) – Grand Prize
Bullet Ballet – Sweden Fantastic Film Festival – Jury Grand Prize
Gemini – Neuchatel International Fantasy Film Festival – Best International Film
A Snake of June – Venice Film Festival – Kinematrix Film Award Feature Films
A Snake of June – Venice Film Festival – San Marco Special Jury Award
Vital – Brussels International Festival of Fantasy Film – Silver Raven
Vital – Sitges – Catalan International Film Festival – New Visions Award
Vital – Fantasporto – Orient Express Section Special Jury Award
Kotoko – The Orizzonti prize at the 68th Venice International Film Festival (2011)

Filmography

Director

Actor

Film

Television

See also
 Shozin Fukui
 Sogo Ishii

References

External links

 Shinya Tsukamoto director profile at subtitledonline.com
 
 

Horror film directors
Japanese film directors
Male actors from Tokyo
1960 births
Living people
Asian Film Award winners